Lisa Hardaway (1966–2017) was an American aerospace engineer and program manager for an instrument on the New Horizons spacecraft to Pluto and Beyond. Among her awards, she was named Engineer of the Year for 2015–2016 by the Colorado American Institute of Aeronautics and Astronautics.

Life
Hardaway graduated from Massachusetts Institute of Technology, Stanford University, and University of Colorado. She worked for Ball Aerospace. She was program manager for RALPH, on the New Horizons mission. She is survived by her husband, James, and two children. 

In the summer of 2017, NASA renamed the LEISA spectrometer on New Horizons to be the Lisa Hardaway Infrared Mapping Spectrometer in her honor.

Awards and honors
 Lisa Hardaway was named "Engineer of the Year" for 2015–2016 by Colorado American Institute of Aeronautics and Astronautics.
 Asteroid 161699 Lisahardaway was named in her memory. The official  was published by the Minor Planet Center on 25 September 2018.
 A crater on Pluto, Hardaway Crater, was also named in her honor in 2021.

References

External links
 https://blogs.scientificamerican.com/voices/gone-in-2017-12-trailblazing-women-in-stem/
 https://www.theatlantic.com/technology/archive/2015/07/the-camera-behind-the-new-horizons-pluto-photos-ralph/398549/
 https://www.prnewswire.com/news-releases/ball-aerospaces-lisa-hardaway-honored-for-exceptional-leadership-by-women-in-aerospace-300163309.html
 https://www.nasa.gov/feature/nasa-s-new-horizons-mission-honors-memory-of-engineer-lisa-hardaway

1966 births
2017 deaths
American aerospace engineers
New Horizons
Massachusetts Institute of Technology alumni
Stanford University alumni
University of Colorado alumni